Renato Mondolfo (10 February 1918 - 2 February 1992) was an Italian philatelist who signed the Roll of Distinguished Philatelists in 1984.

References

Italian philatelists
Signatories to the Roll of Distinguished Philatelists
1918 births
1992 deaths